A Lady's Name is a 1918 American silent drama-comedy film directed by Walter Edwards. The film stars Constance Talmadge, Harrison Ford and Emory Johnson. The film was released on December 10, 1918, by  Select Pictures.

Background
A Lady's Name is a screen version of a play written for the stage by Cyril Harcourt. His play was adapted for the screen by Julia Crawford Ivers.

Plot
Novelist Mabel Vere (Constance Talmadge) is engaged to Gerald Wantage (Emory Johnson).  Mabel is also writing a new book. She needs ideas for her new book. She hatches a plan where she will advertise for a husband and see if the candidates provide the literary inspiration she needs. Gerald is a "stuffed Shirt" who angrily objects to her plan. She proceeds anyway.

It is decided that Mabel's roommate, Maud Bray (Vera Doria), will screen all responders and frighten away the less desirable suitors. This allows Mabel to respond to the more interesting letters.  Shortly Mabel becomes embroiled in a number of adventures.

One of her applicants is a butler.  He is employed by Noel Corcoran (Harrison Ford).  As it turns out, Noel has also answered the ad. Noel informs Mabel that Gerald has bet the other members of his club that she will stop answering letters.

Mabel is furious.  She starts responding to several particularly lurid letters.  Gerald promptly breaks off their engagement. Meanwhile, Noel, who is rich, has fallen in love with Mabel.  Noel gets down on his knee and proposes.  Mabel accepts his proposal.

Cast
{|  
! style="width: 180px; text-align: left;" |  Actor 
! style="width: 230px; text-align: left;" |  Role
|- style="text-align: left;"
|Constance Talmadge||Mabel Vere
|-
|Harrison Ford||Noel Corcoran
|-
|Emory Johnson||Gerald Wantage
|-
|Vera Doria||Maud Bray
|-
|Jim Farley||Flood
|-
|Fred Huntley||Adams
|-
|John Steppling||Bird
|-
|Truman Van Dyke||Bentley
|-
|Lillian Leighton||Mrs. Haines
|-
|ZaSu Pitts||Emily
|-
|Emily Gerdes||Margaret
|-
|}

Preservation Status
According to the Library of Congress website, 4 out of 5 reels survive of this film. The archived copy of this film is stored at New York's Museum of Modern Art.

Picture Gallery

References

External links

American black-and-white films
1918 films
Selznick Pictures films
American silent feature films
Films directed by Walter Edwards
1910s American films
Silent American comedy-drama films
1910s English-language films